Rev. George Barkley Raikes (14 March 1873 – 18 December 1966) was an English sportsman who played first-class cricket for Oxford University and Hampshire as well as representing the England national football team.

Early life
Raikes was born at Carleton Forehoe near Wymondham in Norfolk, Raikes was the second son of Francis Raikes, a clergyman. He grew up at Hedenham Hall in south Norfolk and was educated at Shrewsbury School. He played cricket for the school between 1888 and 1892, captaining the side in his last three years, and kept goal for the school football team between 1890 and 1892. He  went up to Magdalen College, Oxford in 1893. At Oxford he won a blue in football in each of the four years from 1893 to 1896 and cricket blues in 1894 and 1895.

Cricket career
Raikes, a middle order batsman and right-arm fast-medium bowler, played his early first-class cricket at Oxford University where he won his Blue in 1894 and 1895. He joined Hampshire in 1900 and performed well with the bat, making two half-centuries in his first three matches and also scoring a pair of 40s. His brother Ernest and nephew Thomas both played first-class cricket.

The all-rounder was also a successful cricketer in the Minor Counties Championship, where he captained Norfolk County Cricket Club to the Minor Counties Championship title in 1905 and 1910. Raikes scored 3,419 runs for Norfolk in Minor Counties matches at an average of 30.80 runs per innings. He took 282 wickets at a bowling average of 15.86 runs per wicket, 57 of which were taken during the 1910 Championship winning season.

Despite having not played first-class cricket for a decade, Raikes returned in 1912 for a match with an England XI against Australia at Norwich.

Football career
A goalkeeper at football, he played at club level for Oxford University, Wymondham Town and Corinthian. Whilst at Oxford, Raikes was capped four times for England, making his international debut in a 1–1 draw with Wales in 1895. His three other appearances came in 1896, against Ireland, Wales and Scotland respectively.

There is some dispute over whether or not Raikes captained England in their international against Ireland on 7 March 1896, with Gilbert Smith and Vaughan Lodge the others in the frame. The list provided by the F.A. does not include Raikes as an England captain however both the Irish Saturday Night and The Irish Times gave Raikes the captaincy.

Career in the church
After being ordained in 1897, he was a curate of Portsea, Portsmouth, the largest parish of the city until 1905 and then chaplain to the Duke of Portland. In 1920 he became Rector of Bergh Apton in Norfolk, remaining there until 1936. Before his death, at the age of 93, Raikes had been one of the oldest living first-class cricketers.

References

External links
 
 

1873 births
1966 deaths
People from Wymondham
People educated at Shrewsbury School
Alumni of Magdalen College, Oxford
English cricketers
Oxford University cricketers
Hampshire cricketers
Norfolk cricketers
English footballers
England international footballers
Association football goalkeepers
Oxford University A.F.C. players
Corinthian F.C. players
20th-century English Anglican priests
Sportspeople from Norfolk
Oxford University Past and Present cricketers
Non-international England cricketers
Wymondham Town F.C. players